The Old Young People (and also known as The Sad Young Men) is a 1962 Argentine film written and directed by Rodolfo Kuhn. The film won the Silver Condor Award for Best Film and was selected as the Argentine entry for the Best Foreign Language Film at the 35th Academy Awards, but was not accepted as a nominee.

Cast
 María Vaner
 Alberto Argibay
 Marcela López Rey
 Jorge Rivera López
 Graciela Dufau
 Emilio Alfaro

See also
 List of submissions to the 35th Academy Awards for Best Foreign Language Film
 List of Argentine submissions for the Academy Award for Best Foreign Language Film

References

External links
 

1962 films
1962 drama films
1960s Spanish-language films
Argentine black-and-white films
Films directed by Rodolfo Kuhn
Films shot in Mar del Plata
Argentine drama films
1960s Argentine films